The fifteenth season of Family Guy aired on Fox in the United States from September 25, 2016, to May 21, 2017.

The series follows the dysfunctional Griffin family, consisting of father Peter, mother Lois, daughter Meg, son Chris, baby Stewie and the family dog Brian, who reside in their hometown of Quahog. The executive producers for the fifteenth production season are Seth MacFarlane, Richard Appel, Steve Callaghan, Danny Smith and Kara Vallow. The showrunners are Appel and Callaghan.

Guest stars for the season include Kyle Chandler, Stephen Curry, Flea, Rob Gronkowski, Sean Penn, Frank Sinatra Jr., David Tennant, and Jacob Tremblay.

During this season, Chris dates singer Taylor Swift while Peter becomes an Uber driver ("Chris Has Got a Date, Date, Date, Date, Date"), Quagmire gets hooked on Tinder ("The Dating Game"), and also becomes a gigolo during an airline pilot strike ("American Gigg-olo"). Other episode plots include Brian and Stewie writing songs for kids ("The Boys in the Band"), Chris becoming a star baseball player ("Bookie of the Year"), Rob Gronkowski moving in next to Peter with his party bus ("Gronkowsbees"), a homage to three novels commonly taught in (and, in some cases, banned from) American high school English classes ("High School English"), Peter and Lois joining the anti-vaccination movement ("Hot Shots"), Peter meeting the children he never knew he had ("A House Full of Peters"), Chris falling for a Mexican teen mom ("Dearly Deported"), and a fictionalized behind-the-scenes look of the show ("Inside Family Guy").

The season premiere includes a cameo by Vinny (voiced by Tony Sirico), the dog who temporarily replaced Brian in season 12. The season concluded with a one hour broadcast of two episodes.


Episodes

References

2016 American television seasons
2017 American television seasons
Family Guy seasons
Family Guy (season 15) episodes